Magill Road is a major arterial road in the South Australian capital of Adelaide, connecting its inner eastern suburbs past Magill at the western foot of the Mount Lofty Ranges. It has been designated part of route B27.

Route
Magill Road runs east–west, covering many of the city's eastern suburbs. From its western (city) end at Kent Town, at a five-way junction with Payneham Road and Fullarton Road, Magill Road runs east to the foot of the Mount Lofty Ranges, where it branches into Norton Summit Road and Old Norton Summit Road, which pass either side of Teringie up to Norton Summit.

Major intersections

See also

References

Roads in Adelaide